Wayne B. Sappleton (born November 17, 1960) is a retired Jamaican professional basketball player, formerly of the NBA's New Jersey Nets. A 6'9 forward, Sappleton was a star at Loyola University Chicago from 1978-82.

Collegiate career
Sappleton grew up in Kingston, Jamaica where he attended Ardenne High School.  
He eventually moved to the U.S. to play for the Loyola Ramblers from 1978–82 and was the Midwestern City Conference (now the Horizon League) Player of the Year in 1982.  While at Loyola, Sappleton twice finished second in the NCAA in rebounding, in 1981 and 1982.

Professional career 
After completing his collegiate eligibility, Sappleton was drafted by the Golden State Warriors in the 2nd round (38th pick overall) in the 1982 NBA Draft, but his rights were traded to the New Jersey Nets.  After a stop in Italy, Sappleton played in 33 games over the 1984-85 season.  Sappleton averaged 2.9 points and 2.3 rebounds per game over his NBA career.

After the NBA, Sappleton played basketball for several more clubs in Italy.

References

External links
NBA and College stats

1960 births
Living people
Golden State Warriors draft picks
Jamaican expatriate basketball people in Italy
Jamaican expatriate basketball people in Spain
Jamaican expatriate basketball people in the United States
Jamaican men's basketball players
Liga ACB players
Loyola Ramblers men's basketball players
National Basketball Association players from Jamaica
New Jersey Nets players
Power forwards (basketball)